The following articles contain lists of Spanish-language television channels:

 Television in Latin America
 List of Mexican television networks
 List of Spanish-language television networks in the United States
 Television in Spain